The Afrikaner Weerstandsbeweging, meaning "Afrikaner Resistance Movement", commonly known by its abbreviation AWB, is an Afrikaner nationalist, neo-Nazi, and white supremacist political party in South Africa. Since its founding in 1973 by Eugène Terre'Blanche and six other far-right Afrikaners, it has been dedicated to secessionist Afrikaner nationalism and the creation of an independent Boer-Afrikaner republic or "" in part of South Africa. During bilateral negotiations to end apartheid in the early 1990s, the organisation terrorised and killed black South Africans.

, it is reported that the organization has around 5,000 members, and uses social media for recruitment.

History
On 7 July 1973, Eugène Terre'Blanche, a former police officer, called a meeting of several men in Heidelberg, Gauteng, in the then-Transvaal Province of South Africa. He was disillusioned by what he thought were Prime Minister B.J. Vorster's "liberal views" of racial issues in the White minority country, after a period in which Black majorities had ascended to power in many former colonies. Terre'Blanche also worried about what he characterised as communist influences in South African society. He decided to form a group with six other like-minded persons, which they named the Afrikaner Weerstandsbeweging (Afrikaner Resistance Movement) (AWB), to promote Afrikaner and Christian nationalism. His associates elected him as head of the group, a position he held until he was murdered on his farm in April 2010.

Their objective was to establish an independent Boerestaat ("Boer State") for Boer-Afrikaner people only. It was to be independent of apartheid South Africa, which they considered too left-wing and liberal. The AWB was formed to try to regain the ground they thought lost after the Second Boer War; the men intended to re-establish the independent Boer Republics of the past: the South African Republic (Zuid-Afrikaansche Republiek) and the Republic of the Orange Free State (Oranje Vrystaat).

Apartheid era

During the 1970s and 1980s, the AWB attracted several thousand White South Africans as members. They opposed the reform of apartheid laws during the 1980s, harassing liberal politicians and holding large (and often quite rowdy) political rallies. Terre'Blanche used his flamboyant oratorial skills and forceful personality to win converts. He railed against the lifting of many so-called "petty apartheid" laws, such as the law banning interracial sex and marriage (the Race Relations Act), mixing of the races (Group Areas Act), as well as the government providing limited political rights to Indians and Coloureds (mixed-race individuals). During the State of Emergency (1984-86), AWB violence and murders of unarmed non-Whites were reported. The AWB especially opposed the then-illegal African National Congress (ANC). The ruling National Party considered the AWB to be little more than a fringe group.

The group operated relatively unhindered until 1986, when White South African Police (SAP) Police officers took the unprecedented step of using lachrymatory agent or tear gas against the AWB when they disrupted a National Party rally. In 1988, the organisation was estimated to have had support amongst 5-7% of the White South African population. In the Nick Broomfield documentary film, His Big White Self (2006), he claimed the organisation reached a peak of half a million supporters in its heyday.

During the end of apartheid

During the negotiations that led to South Africa's first multiracial election, the AWB engaged in violence and murder. During the Battle of Ventersdorp in August 1991, the AWB confronted police in front of the town hall where State President F. W. de Klerk was speaking, and "a number of people were killed or injured" in the conflict. Later in the negotiations, the AWB stormed the Kempton Park World Trade Centre where the negotiations were taking place, breaking through the glass front of the building with an armoured car. The police guarding the centre failed to prevent the invasion. The invaders then took over the main conference hall, threatening delegates and painting slogans on the walls, but left again after a short period. Six AWB members were sentenced to death for the murder of four black people at a fake roadblock they set up to terrorise black travellers.

In 1988, the AWB was beset by scandal when claims that Terre'Blanche had had an affair with journalist Jani Allan surfaced. In July 1989, Cornelius Lottering, a member of a breakaway AWB group Orde van die Dood (Order of the Dead), attempted to assassinate Allan by placing a bomb outside her Sandton apartment. Nick Broomfield's 1991 documentary The Leader, His Driver and the Driver's Wife claimed that Terre'Blanche had sex with Allan, a claim she denied. This led to Allan taking libel proceedings against the documentary broadcaster Channel 4 in 1992 at the London High Court. During the trial, several transcripts of their alleged unconventional sexual positions appeared in the South African and British press. Terre'Blanche also submitted a sworn statement to the London court denying that he had had an affair with Allan. Although the judge found that Channel 4's allegations had not defamed Allan, he did not rule on whether or not there had been an affair.

Bophuthatswana crisis

In 1994, before the advent of majority rule, the AWB gained international notoriety in its attempt to defend the dictatorial government of Lucas Mangope in the homeland of Bophuthatswana. The AWB, along with a contingent of about 90 Afrikaner Volksfront militiamen, entered the capital Mmabatho on 10 and 11 March. The black policemen and soldiers of the Bophuthatswana Defence Force who were out in force to support President Mangope disappeared from the streets in protest at the AWB's actions and later turned on the militiamen at the airport at Mafikeng. One AWB member was shot and killed when the convoy attempted to leave the airport and continue on to Mmabatho. When in Mmabatho, the AWB and the Afrikaner Volksfront found themselves under continuous siege from both the Bophuthatswana Defence Force and Mmabatho citizens. When attempting to retreat from Mmabatho on 11 March, three AWB members were summarily killed after they had been wounded in a firefight, by a rogue Bophuthatswana Defence Force member who defected to the ANC. Nearby photojournalists and television news crews recorded the incident, which proved to be a public relations disaster for the AWB, demoralising its White members. The AWB claimed that they were asked into the country and only entered trying to help the Bophuthatswana Government, but the Tebbutt Commission found the "evidence is overwhelming that they entered the area uninvited and that they were not welcome there".

Post-apartheid
On 17 June 2001, Terre'Blanche was sentenced to six years in prison for assaulting a petrol station employee, John Ndzima, to such an extent as to cause permanent brain damage, and the attempted murder of a security guard and former employee, Paul Motshabi. Terre'Blanche was released in June 2004 after serving three years in Rooigrond Prison near Mafikeng. During his time in prison, he became a born-again Christian and claimed he had moderated many of his more ethno-nationalist views and preached reconciliation as 'prescribed by God'.

In April 2007, AWB posters appeared at the 13th Klein Karoo National Arts Festival in Oudtshoorn. Several posters made reference to the Bok van Blerk song "De la Rey", an Afrikaans hit record about the Boer General as well as to South Africa's former Coat of Arms. Organisers were quick to remove the posters.

In March 2008, the AWB announced it was re-activating for 'populist' reasons, citing the encouragement of the public. Reasons for their return include: the electricity crisis, corruption across government departments and rampant crime. Plans include a demand for land that they claim is legally theirs in terms of the Sand River Convention of 1852 and other historical treaties, through the International Court of Justice in The Hague if necessary, and if that failed, taking up arms. In April 2008, Terre'Blanche was to be the speaker at several AWB rallies in Vryburg, Middelburg and Pretoria. Several areas in South Africa have been earmarked as part of a future Volkstaat according to three critical title deeds. The areas include Vryheid in KwaZulu-Natal, the old Republics of Stellaland and Goshen in the far North-West and sections of the Free State.

The Mail & Guardian newspaper reported in 2008 that the AWB group has over 5,000 members, and appeals to 18- to 35-year-olds to join the organisation's youth wing. The South African press reported in 2016 that the AWB continue to use social media to recruit new members.

In 2010, Terre'Blanche was killed by an employee on his farm, and Steyn von Rönge was announced as new leader of the organisation.

Leader

Logo

The AWB flag is composed of three black sevens forming a triskelion in a white circle upon a red background, similar to the flag of Nazi Germany. According to AWB, the sevens, 'the number of final victory', 'stand to oppose the number 666, the number of the anti-Christ'. Red is considered to represent Jesus' blood and the struggle of the Christians, while black stands for bravery. The inner white circle symbolises the "purity" and "eternal life".

The AWB also uses the "Vierkleur", the original flag of the once independent South African Republic, the flag of the Orange Free State and the old flag of South Africa that was used from 1928 to 1994 but with the British flag replaced.

In fiction
The organisation is a popular antagonist amongst writers of alternate history literature. Several members of a fictionalised AWB are important characters in Harry Turtledove's American Civil War alternate history novel The Guns of the South (1992). The AWB also features prominently in Larry Bond's novel of a Cold War-era civil war/international conflict in South Africa, Vortex (1991). It also appears in Richard Herman Jr.'s novel, Iron Gate (1996).

See also

 (Don't) touch me on my studio

Similar groups
 Afrikaner Volksfront
 Boerestaat Party
 Vereniging van Oranjewerkers

Separatism
 Orania
 Volkstaat

Documentary films
 His Big White Self
 The Leader, His Driver and the Driver's Wife
 Louis Theroux's Weird Weekends episode 3.3

References

Further reading
  (details the Bophuthatswana incident)

External links

 
 Truth and Reconciliation application by Ontlametse Menyatsoe who was at the centre of the Bophuthatswana incident
 South African Press Association (1997): AWB EXPRESSES REGRETS OVER BOP KILLINGS, RACISM
 The return of Eugene Terre'Blanche : Independent Online 30 March 2008
 Rising Right : Independent Online 10 May 2008
 'All time high' for AWB : Independent Online 10 May 2008
 'My beloved country' documentary film about AWB
 The rise and fall of South Africa's far right: The Outline 30 October 2017

 
1973 establishments in South Africa
Afrikaner nationalism
Boer nationalism
Antisemitism in South Africa
Anti-Masonry
Organisations associated with apartheid
Organizations established in 1973
Racism in South Africa
Rebel groups in South Africa
Sexism in South Africa
Separatism in South Africa
Terrorism in South Africa
Neo-Nazism in South Africa
Organizations that oppose LGBT rights
Neo-Nazi organizations